Vexxed is an Irish YouTube personality. He is known for his vlogs and videos about other YouTube creators, especially his 2018 documentary about his own visit to North Korea. He maintains the YouTube channel Vexxed along with his series Exposed Youtubers.  As of February 2022, he has 484,000 subscribers.

Career
Around mid-October 2016, Vexxed uploaded a new video, noting that Eugenia Cooney, a video creator, was severely underweight. Vexxed compares Eugenia from years prior, estimating her BMI as centering around 14.

Around March 2017, he visited North Korea's main square, filming a video. He took photos and videos of the main square and its environs, restricted for foreign visitors. Although asked to delete it by his tour guide, he refused, with media deeming the act risky.

His Exposing Youtubers series consists of commenting on other users' acts, some including their fraud of their viewers for money.
One of his videos discusses Trap Nation, a popular music YouTuber which he claimed was hacking, buying malware and spreading Trojan viruses using his YouTube channel. The video was disliked by bots sent out from members of Hack Forums. In addition, he was offered up to 10,000 USD to take the video down by Trap Nation and Kareem, a hacker cooperating with Trap Nation. However, he refused and the video remained.

In early 2018, Vexxed was banned on Twitch. According to Twitch, he was banned for nudity on-stream. He later claimed that he was changing with underwear on without knowing he was on-stream. 
Later in October, an email advertising Twitch was sent to him. He posted it on his Twitter account, describing the experience as 'salt in the wound'.

References

Living people
Irish YouTubers
Year of birth missing (living people)
Place of birth missing (living people)
Twitch (service) streamers